This list comprises all players who have participated in at least one league match for Crystal Palace Baltimore since the team's first season in USL in 2007. Players who were on the roster but never played a first team game are not listed; players who appeared for the team in other competitions (US Open Cup, CONCACAF Champions League, etc.) but never actually made an USL appearance are noted at the bottom of the page where appropriate.

A "†" denotes players who only appeared in a single match.

A
  Olawale Adelusimi
  Joshua Alcala
  Taj Alvaranga

B
  Stephen Basso
  Michael Behonick
  Gary Brooks
  Adrian Bumbut
  Evan Bush

C
  Daniel Capecci
  Jim Cherneski
  Billy Chiles

D
  Mateus Dos Anjos

F
  David Feazell
  Sergio Flores
  Zack Flores
  Robert Fucci
  Santiago Fusilier

G
  Kevin Gnatiko
  Lucio Gonzaga

H
  Shintaro Harada
  Bryan Harkin
  Chase Harrison
  Pat Healey
  Andrew Herman
  Josh Hicks †

J
  John Jonke †

K
  Ibrahim Kante
  Kevin King

L
  Dan Lader
  Cecil Lewis
  Mike Lookingland

M
  Larry Mark
  Andrew Marshall
  Matthew Mbuta
  Machel Millwood
  Carlos Morales
  Mark Murphy

N
  Matthew Nelson
  Adauto Neto
  Takuro Nishimura
  John Barry Nusum

O
  Alan O'Hara

P
  Randi Patterson
  Shaun Pejic
  Yaikel Perez
  Ryan Pierce

R
  Paul Robson
  Brian Rowland
  Sean Rush

S
  Alan Sanchez
  Jordan Seabrook
  Charlie Sheringham
  Lewwis Spence

T
  Val Teixeira
  Zak Thompson

U
  Idris Ughiovhe
  Harold Urquijo

V
  Korey Veeder
  Kénold Versailles
  Neil Vranis

Y
  Tsuyoshi Yoshitake

Z
  Nick Zimmerman

Sources

Crystal Palace Baltimore
 
Association football player non-biographical articles